Ammaiyarkuppam is a census town in Thiruvallur district  in the state of Tamil Nadu, India.

Demographics
 India census, Ammaiyarkuppam had a population of 15234. Males constitute 62% of the population and females 38%. Ammaiyarkuppam has an average literacy rate of 76%, higher than the national average of 59.5%; with 61% of the males and 39% of females literate. 14% of the population is under 6 years of age.

References

Cities and towns in Tiruvallur district